Morávka is a river in the Moravian-Silesian Region of the Czech Republic. It flows through the historical region of Cieszyn Silesia.

It originates on the slope of Sulov mountain in the Moravian-Silesian Beskids in the elevation of 880 m, near the border with Slovakia. It then flows in northwestward direction through the sparsely populated area. Some 10 km from the source the Morávka Dam was built in 1960–1966. Lower course of the river is unique due to its natural character and as such it is protected. Morávka enters to the Ostravice River from the right side in Frýdek-Místek.

Municipalities

Morávka
Pražmo
Raškovice
Vyšní Lhoty
Nižní Lhoty
Nošovice
Dobrá
Staré Město
Frýdek-Místek

Rivers of the Moravian-Silesian Region
Moravian-Silesian Beskids
Cieszyn Silesia
Frýdek-Místek District
Braided rivers in Europe